Byron is a historical play by the British writer Alicia Ramsey, which was first performed in 1908. It depicts the life of the early nineteenth-century writer Lord Byron.

Adaptation

In 1922 the play was adapted into a silent film A Prince of Lovers directed by Charles Calvert and starring Howard Gaye as Byron.

Notes

Biographical plays about writers
1908 plays
Plays set in England
Plays set in the 19th century
Plays based on real people
British plays adapted into films
Cultural depictions of Lord Byron